The 2011–12 Primeira Liga (also known as Liga ZON Sagres for sponsorship reasons) was the 78th season of the Primeira Liga, the top professional league for Portuguese association football clubs. It began on 14 August 2011 and ended on 13 May 2012. A total of 16 teams contested the league, 14 of which already took part in the previous season and two of which were promoted from the Liga de Honra. Porto were the defending champions and secured their 26th and second consecutive league title. Óscar Cardozo and Lima, respectively Benfica's and Braga's strikers, were the joint top scorers with 20 goals.

Teams
Sixteen teams contested the league, fourteen of which already contested in the 2010–11 season and two of which were promoted from the 2010–11 Liga de Honra. The two teams relegated following the 2010–11 season were Portimonense, which returned to the Liga de Honra just a year after promotion, and Naval, returning to the second tier after a six-year stay. Replacing them in the top flight were Liga de Honra champions Gil Vicente, competing in their 14th Liga season after returning from a five-year absence, and Feirense, who were in the top division for the fourth time and the first since the 1989–90 season.

Stadia and locations

Personnel and kits

Note: Flags indicate national team as has been defined under FIFA eligibility rules. Players and Managers may hold more than one non-FIFA nationality.

Managerial changes

League table

Positions by round

Results

Season statistics

Top goalscorers

Last updated: 13 May 2012, 00:25 UTC

Assists table

Last updated: 7 May 2012, 12:48 UTC

Hat-tricks

Awards

Monthly awards

SJPF Player of the Month

SJPF Young Player of the Month

Annual awards

Portuguese Golden Ball 
The Portuguese Golden Ball was given to James Rodríguez, the youngest player (21) to ever receive the award.

LPFP Primeira Liga Player of the Year 
The LPFP Primeira Liga Player of the Year was awarded to Hulk. He became the first player to win the award twice.

LPFP Primeira Liga Breakthrough Player of the Year 
The LPFP Primeira Liga Breakthrough Player of the Year was awarded to James Rodríguez.

LPFP Primeira Liga Goalkeeper of the Year 
The LPFP Primeira Liga Goalkeeper of the Year was awarded to Rui Patrício.

LPFP Primeira Liga Manager of the Year 
The LPFP Primeira Liga Coach of the Year was awarded to Vítor Pereira.

LPFP Primeira Liga Fairplay Award 
The LPFP Primeira Liga Fairplay Award was awarded to Rio Ave.

Transfers

Notes
 Baba moved to Sevilla during the winter transfer window.

References

Primeira Liga seasons
Port
1